A construction worker is a worker employed in the physical construction of the built environment and its infrastructure.

Definition
By some definitions, workers may be engaged in manual labour as unskilled or semi-skilled workers; they may be skilled tradespeople; or they may be supervisory or managerial personnel. Under safety legislation in the United Kingdom, for example, construction workers are defined as people "who work for or under the control of a contractor on a construction site"; in Canada, this can include people whose work includes ensuring conformance with building codes and regulations, and those who supervise other workers.

The term is a broad and generic one and most construction workers are primarily described by the specific level and type of work they perform. Laborers comprise a large grouping in most national construction industries. In the United States, for example, in May 2021 the construction sector employed just over 7.5 million people, of whom just over 820,000 were laborers, while 573,000 were carpenters, 508,000 were electricians, 258,000 were equipment operators and 230,000 were construction managers. Like most business sectors, there is also substantial white-collar employment in construction - 681,000 US workers were recorded by the United States Department of Labor as in 'office and administrative support occupations' in May 2021.

Construction workers can colloquially be referred to as "hard hat workers" or "hard hats", as they often wear hard hats for safety.

Safety 

Construction safety is intended to ensure a safe environment for workers, who are required to be educated on safety at each site.

Examples of poor pay and working conditions for migrant workers
In 2008, a Human Rights Watch report described unsafe and unfair working conditions in China and a failure on the part of the government to enforce labor standards in the construction industry. The International Labour Organization (ILO) estimated that, at the end of 2006, 90% of the 40 million construction workers in China were migrant workers. Many turned to work after their farming communities collapsed into poverty.

In the United States, illegal immigrant labor is prevalent in the industry. Due to workers' questionable legal status, some employers commit crimes such as wage theft and violation of workplace standards, running little risk of consequences. Similar abuse occurred in Qatar during preparations for the 2022 FIFA World Cup where workers mostly from poor countries in the Indian Sub-continent work in desert conditions for as little as €6.20 a day.

See also

Civil engineering
Dirty, Dangerous and Demeaning
Index of construction articles
List of topics on working time and conditions
Outline of construction

References

External links

Worker